Brisa – Auto-estradas de Portugal, S.A. is a Portugal-based international transportation company. The group's largest business area is highway management, in which it is the largest concessionaire in its home country. Founded in 1972 by Jorge de Brito, Brisa also has operations in countries including the United States and the Netherlands. Since 2000 Brisa's largest shareholder has been the investment company Grupo José de Mello, which owns over 30% of its stock through subsidiaries. The Spanish infrastructure company Abertis holds around 15% of the firm. The company is listed on the Lisbon Stock Exchange and is a constituent of the benchmark PSI-20 and Euronext 100 indices. Its current CEO is António Pires de Lima.

Operations

Portugal
In Portugal Brisa exclusively operates the following motorways with a concession lasting until 2035:
 A1 - Auto-estrada do Norte
 A2 - Auto-estrada do Sul
 A3 - Auto-estrada Porto/Valença
 A4 - Auto-estrada Matosinhos/Amarante
 A5 - Auto-estrada da Costa do Estoril
 A6 - Auto-estrada Marateca/Caia
 A9 - CREL - Circular Regional Exterior de Lisboa
 A10 - Auto-estrada Bucelas/Carregado/IC3
 A12 - Auto-estrada Setúbal/Montijo
 A13 - Auto-estrada Almeirim/Marateca
 A14 - Auto-estrada Figueira da Foz/Coimbra Norte

Brisa owns 50% of Auto-Estradas do Atlântico, operator of the A8 and A15 motorways until 2028; 70% of the Brisal concession, which is licensed to run the A17 road until 2034; and with a 45% stake heads the Douro Litoral consortium which will operate the A32, A41 and A43 motorways until 2034.

Two further tenders were awarded to consortia including Brisa in 2009. The firm leads the Auto-estradas do Baixo Tejo concession with a 30% stake, which includes construction, widening, operation and maintenance of motorways and Itinerários Complementares trunk roads in the Setúbal area. Brisa also holds 15% of the Litoral Oeste concession, which covers 112 km of new and existing road around Leiria. Both contracts were awarded through to 2038.

Other major investments held by the company within Portugal include 60% of the Via Verde electronic toll collection system, also used in car parks and for other purposes; 100% of roadside assistance firm Brisa Assistência Rodoviária; and 60% of Controlauto, a chain of outlets offering vehicle inspection services.

The company has signalled its intent to diversify into other modes of transportation. In December 2009 a Brisa-led consortium was awarded a contract to construct the first stage of a high-speed rail link between Lisbon and Madrid by the Portuguese government, giving it a 40-year concession to operate the line within Portugal. Brisa, along with Mota-Engil, also heads the Asterion consortium which intends to bid for control of the Portuguese airport authority ANA should it be privatised by the government; and with it the right to construct and operate the proposed replacement for Lisbon's international airport in Alcochete.

International

In the United States, Brisa holds 100% of the operation of the Northwest Parkway toll road near Denver, Colorado since 2007. In 2007 the firm purchased 30% of Movenience, the electronic toll collection system used in the Western Scheldt Tunnel in the Dutch province of Zeeland; this stake was increased to 40% in 2010.

Brisa's 16.3% holding in Brazilian peer Companhia de Concessões Rodoviárias (CCR) was sold in June 2010.

See also
Transport in Portugal

References

External links
 

Transport companies of Portugal
Private road operators